Rhopalomyia chrysothamni is a species of gall midges, insects in the family Cecidomyiidae. The midge causes very small, conical-tubular stem galls on rubber rabbitbrush [Ericameria nauseosa].

References

Further reading

 
 

Cecidomyiinae
Articles created by Qbugbot
Insects described in 1916